Michael Weiner may refer to:

Michael Weiner (professor) (born 1949), professor of East Asian History
Michael Weiner (actor) (born 1975), American actor and composer
Michael Savage (Michael Weiner, born 1942), American talk-radio host and commentator
Michael Weiner (executive) (1961–2013), executive director of Major League Baseball Players Association
Michael Weiner (referee) (born 1969), German football referee